Miss World Philippines 2014 was the 4th edition of the Miss World Philippines pageant. It was held at the Mall of Asia Arena in Pasay, Philippines on October 12, 2014. 
 
At the end of the event, Megan Young crowned Valerie Weigmann as Miss World Philippines 2014. Lorraine Kendrickson was named as First Princess, Nelda Ibe as Second Princess, Nicole Kim Donesa as Third Princess, and Rachel Peters as Fourth Princess.
 
Weigmann represented the Philippines at the Miss World 2014 pageant held in London and finished as a Top 25 semifinalist.

Results
Color keys
  The contestant was a Semi-Finalist in an International pageant.

Special Awards

Contestants 
26 contestants competed for the title.

Notes

Post-pageant Notes 

 Valerie Weigmann competed at the Miss World 2014 pageant held in London and finished as a Top 25 semifinalist.
 Rachel Peters and Nelda Ibe both competed at Binibining Pilipinas 2017 where Peters was crowned as Binibining Pilipinas Universe 2017 while Ibe was crowned as Binibining Pilipinas Globe 2017. Peters competed at Miss Universe 2017 and finished as a Top 10 finalist, while Ibe competed at Miss Globe 2017 and finished as First Runner-Up.
 Gazini Ganados competed at Binibining Pilipinas 2019 and was crowned as Binibining Pilipinas Universe 2019. Ganados competed at Miss Universe 2019 in Atlanta, Georgia where she finished as a Top 20 semifinalist.

References

External links
 Official Miss World Philippines website
 

2014 beauty pageants
2014 in the Philippines
2014